Servia is one of the main towns in the Kozani regional unit, West Macedonia, Greece. It is one of the most historical places in the region, with a 6th-century Byzantine castle and the Kamvounia mountain dominating the landscape. There are also a number of 10th century Byzantine cave hermitages and small churches located nearby, which add to the Byzantine atmosphere of the area.

Since the local government reform of 2019, it is the seat of the extended municipality of Servia. From 2011 to 2019, the town was the seat of the Municipality of Servia-Velventos. The town itself has a population of 3,540 people (2011 census). The municipal unit Servia has an area of 400.116 km2, the community (the town proper) has an area of 51.603 km2.

Etymology 
Its name derives from the Latin verb servo, meaning "to watch over" or from the ethnonym "", replacing what is thought to be the ancient name of the town Phylacae from the Greek verb  "to watch over". 
The ancient name of the town of Servia is also mentioned by Roman writer Pliny the Elder as well as on an Ancient Greek inscription found at the city of Veroia which reads: "", i.e. "Parmenion son of Glauceas from Phylacae winner at Doliche".

History

Prehistoric period
Servia has given its name to the prehistoric settlement site beside the former bridge across the Haliakmon river to the west and now submerged deep below the surface of Lake Polyphytos. This was first reported by Alan John Bayard Wace and first excavated by the British School at Athens under the direction of Walter Heurtley in 1930. Renewed excavations were jointly conducted by the Greek Archaeological Service and the British School at Athens under the direction of Aikaterina Rhomiopoulou and Cressida Ridley between 1971 and 1973; in advance before the completion of the Polyphytos hydro-electric dam and the flooding of the valley, to create Polyphytos lake.

The site is a low mound created by the debris of successive phases of human occupation, starting in the Middle Neolithic period before 5000 BCE. The square or rectangular buildings, one or two storeys in height, were framed with massive oak posts and the walls were created with wattle and daub. The 'classic' red on cream ceramic repertoire of this phase is closely related to that of Thessaly at such sites as Sesklo and Achilleion. Typical shapes are fruitstands, shallow bowls and beakers. Bone and stone tools are frequent while ornaments of stone and sea shell (Spondylus gaederopus and Glycimeris) are quite frequent. Occupation continued for a thousand years until the early stages of the Late Neolithic period, characterised by black burnished and grey-on-grey pottery. Occasional fragments of pottery of other styles, together with occasional pieces of obsidian from Melos show that long distance 'trade' links had been established with coastal Thessaly and Eastern Macedonia. After a long interval, occupation resumed in the Early Bronze Age (3rd millennium BC)when the ceramic repertoire suggests a cultural orientation towards Central Macedonia rather than Thessaly.

Palaeobotanical studies of seeds and other plant remains recovered from all periods at the site and studied by R. Housely and R. Hubbard provide important information about early Greek agricultural practices.

Ancient period
During ancient times, Servia served as a fort for the passageway between Macedonia and Thessaly, hence its name. As time passed people settled around the area and the town of Phylacae was created. People that have passed through the then town of Servia, include Alexander the Great, on his way to Thebes in 335 B.C., and Apostle Paul during his journey to Macedonia in the first century A.D.

Byzantine period
Servia reached its peak as part of the Eastern Roman Empire when it developed as a strong castle-city (Greek: καστροπολιτεία) guarding the ancient passage from Macedonia to Thessaly. In October 1256,  Theodoros II Laskaris, emperor of Nicaea, married his daughter Maria to Nicephorus Angelos, son of the despot of Epirus  Michael II Komnenos. As a wedding gift, Theodoros was given the cities of Servia and Dyrrachium. As Servia was a prosperous Byzantine town due to trade, it is mentioned in a large number of medieval texts, by writers such as emperor Constantine VII in the mid 10th century, and by Emperor John VI in the 14th century. Servia is also mentioned in the Chronicle of the Morea.

Ottoman period
The Ottoman Turks captured Servia in 1393. In 1519 (Hijri 925) the town of Serfiçe was inhabited by Muslims and Christians. It had 49 Muslim households and 646 Christian households and it was a zeamet of Mevlana Ahmet Çelebi.. In 1745 the seat of the Bishop of Servia was moved to the nearby city of Kozani being renamed as the Holy Diocese of Servia and Kozani. At the start of the Greek revolution in 1821, the Ottomans ordered Turkish and Albanian irregular military to plunder the region and prevent the formation of links with Greek revolutionaries of the Olympus and Vermio regions. After the collapse of the Greek revolution in Macedonia, revolutionaries of the region moved to the South, where they joined fforces with Greeks in the Peloponnese. A prominent revolutionary from the town was Zisis Sotiriou. In 1864, the town became the seat of the Sanjak of Serfiğe in the Manastir Vilayet, and the town was known as Serfiçe in Ottoman Turkish (also written Serfidze).

20th century
The Greek army entered Servia on 10 October 1912, during the First Balkan War, after its victory against the Ottoman army in the Battle of Sarantaporo. On the same day, 117 prominent citizens of Servia were gathered and executed by the Ottomans who were leaving the city, 75 to 90 severed human heads were lined up on either side of one of its streets. From then on the main road of the town leading to the Town Hall is called "117 Εθνομαρτύρων" (117 ethnomartyron), i.e. "Of the 117 National martyrs", in remembrance of this dreadful event. Servia was granted to the Kingdom of Greece by the Treaty of Bucharest in 1913.

During the Second World War, on 6 March 1943, Italian troops set the town on fire in response to the defeat and capture of an Italian battalion at the Battle of Fardykambos by the Greek Resistance. After this fire the whole town was left in ruins and most of Greek neoclassical architecture was lost apart from 3 houses which remain until today. One of them was turned into the Folk Museum of Servia.

Recent history

Today Servia stands as one of the main towns and agricultural centres of the surrounding region, with its extended Servia-Velventos municipality having a population of 14,830 people (2011 census). Main road access into Servia is provided by Greek National Road 3, which passes through the town and is part of the European route E65, connecting the cities of Florina and Kozani with Larissa.

A recent historical event that occurred in Servia, was a holy liturgy, celebrated by Metropolitan Paulos of Servia and Kozani at the 7th century Metropolitan Church of St. Demetrius (now in ruins). The event which took place during the summer of 2008 was the first liturgy at the site after 600 years. On Thursday 28 June 2012, the Ecumenical Patriarch Bartholomew visited Servia taking part in Great Vespers at the Church of Agia Kyriake and afterwards visited the old Basilica of Agios Demetrios and the Byzantine castle-city of Servia. The patron Saint of the town is Agia Kyriake.

Administration

The municipality of Servia consists of three municipal units:
Kamvounia
Livadero
Servia

The municipal unit of Servia is subdivided into the following communities:

 Avles
 Goules
 Imera
 Kastania
 Kranidia
 Lefkara
 Mesiani
 Metaxas
 Neraida
 Platanorrevma
 Polyrracho
 Roditis
 Servia
 Trigoniko
 Vathylakkos

Sights of interest
 Byzantine castle built in the 6th century by Justinian. Unfortunately only one of its four towers remain in full as it was bombed by the Germans during World War II.
 The high bridge of lake Polyphytos.
 The Servia gorge.
 The Noktaria geological formations at the village of Mikrovalto.
 The Folk Museum of Servia.
 Various Byzantine cave-churches, most famous the church of Agios Antonios Kremastos.

Notable people
St. Theodora (13th century), Queen of Epirus.
Georgios Kontaris (17th century), scholar.
Eugenios Pateras (19th century), Bishop of Servia and Kozani.
Zisis Sotiriou (19th century), revolutionary of the Greek War of Independence.
Georgios Zorbas, (1867–1941), the main hero of the novel by Nikos Kazantzakis, "Zorba the Greek".
John Zizioulas (born 1931), theologian and chairman of the Academy of Athens.
Apostolos Gkountoulas (born 1985), Olympic rower
Nikolaos Gkountoulas (born 1985), Olympic rower

Culture and sports
The Philharmonic band of the town, established in 1928, is run by the "Morphotikos Omilos Servion", which is the main Cultural Society of the town. It organises a wide range of cultural events and supports teaching classes for children and adults in painting, dance, choir, and chess. Hang gliding is prominent in the area as national championships are held at the cliffs near Kastania. The Servia cycling competition is held annually, with cyclists from all over the country completing one round of the Polyphytos lake; the cycling tour is about 60 km long at 1000 m altitude. Rowing and other water sports at the lake are also established, via the Kozani nautical club. The town's football team is "Titan" (Τιτάν), founded in 1927, and the basketball team is "Anagennisi" (Αναγέννηση).

See also
The Archeological Museum of Aeani
Lake Polyfytos Bridge
Noktaria Geological Park
Velventos
Aeani

Gallery

References

External links
 Municipality of Servia (official website)

Populated places in Kozani (regional unit)
Neolithic settlements in Macedonia (region)
Municipalities of Western Macedonia